Eric Goldberg may refer to:

 Eric Goldberg (artist) (1890–1969), Canadian painter
 Eric Goldberg (animator) (born 1955), American animator and film director
 Eric Goldberg (game designer) (born 1959), American designer of board, role-playing, and computer games